Pia Di Ciaula ACE, CCE is a BAFTA winning international film editor best known for editing 'A Very English Scandal', 'The Crown' and 'Tyrannosaur'.

Di Ciaula was born to Italian parents in Toronto where she began her film editing career. She received a Gemini Award Nomination for Best Editing on Choices of the Heart: The Margaret Sanger Story. She received two Genie Award Nominations for Best Editing for her first two feature films that were Canadian/UK co-productions, Intimate Relations starring Julie Walters, and Regeneration starring Jonathan Pryce. She then relocated to London, England and collaborated with Gillies MacKinnon on seven films including Hideous Kinky with Kate Winslet, Pure with Keira Knightley, and The Last of the Blonde Bombshells winning Judi Dench a Golden Globe and a BAFTA.

Di Ciaula's second collaboration with Keira Knightley was on Silk, written and directed by François Girard. Other features include Nora starring Ewan McGregor, and Belle.

Di Ciaula's prolific collaboration with director David Blair resulted in the multi-Emmy and BAFTA Award winning show The Street starring Timothy Spall and Tess of the D'Urbervilles starring Gemma Arterton and Eddie Redmayne,

Hugh Hudson (Chariots of Fire, Greystoke) and Di Ciaula collaborated on Altamira starring Antonio Banderas. Di Ciaula then edited A Quiet Passion with "the UK's greatest living autour" Terence Davies, starring Cynthia Nixon as Emily Dickinson along with Keith Carradine and Jennifer Ehle.

Di Ciaula's first collaboration with actor/writer/director Paddy Considine on Tyrannosaur won approximately 40 awards world-wide including Sundance, Best Independent British Film and a BAFTA. Di Ciaula and Considine's wonderful collaboration continued on his sophomore film Journeyman which will premier at the London Film Festival in 2017.

Di Ciaula edited the first two seasons of The Crown with three time Oscar nominated Stephen Daldry (The Reader, The Hours) and two time Oscar nominated Peter Morgan (Frost/Nixon, The Queen). The Crown is a multi-Golden Globe, Emmy and BAFTA winner and Pia Di Ciaula was BAFTA nominated for Best Editing: Fiction for Season 2, Episode 9, Paterfamilias.

Di Ciaula won a BAFTA for editing A Very English Scandal, directed by Stephen Frears and starring Hugh Grant and Ben Whishaw.

Filmography
Silent Night (2021)
Dirt Music (2019)
Hope Gap film (2019)
A Very English Scandal (mini-series) 2018
The Crown 2016-17 3 episodes
Journeyman 2016
A Quiet Passion (film) 2016
Altamira (film) 2015
The Journey Home (film) 2013-14
Belle (film) 2012-13
Tyrannosaur (2011)
Strike Back (2 episodes, 2010)
Blood and Oil (2009) (TV)
The Fattest Man in Britain (2009) (TV)
Tess of the D'Urbervilles (2008) (mini-series)
Burn Up (2008) (mini-series)
The Street (4 episodes, 2007–2009)
Stuart: A Life Backwards (2007) (TV)
Silk film (2007)
Mysterious Creatures (2006) (TV)
Tara Road film (2005)
Gunpowder, Treason & Plot (2004) (TV)
Double Bill (2003) (TV)
Byron (2003) (TV)
The One and Only (2002)
Pure (2002)
The Escapist (2002)
The Last of the Blonde Bombshells (2000) (TV)
Nora (2000)
The Last Yellow film (1999)
Hideous Kinky (1998)
The Real Howard Spitz (1998)
Regeneration (Behind the Lines) (1997) film
Night Visitors (1996) (TV)
Mother, May I Sleep with Danger? (1996) (TV)
Intimate Relations (1996)
The Deliverance of Elaine (1996) (TV)
Visitors of the Night (1995) (TV)
Dancing in the Dark (1995) (TV)
Choices of the Heart: The Margaret Sanger Story (1995) (TV)
Falling for You (1995) (TV)
Deadly Love (1995) (TV)
Another Woman (1994) (TV)
Ready or Not (7 episodes, 1993–1994)
Hush Little Baby (1993) (TV)
Road to Avonlea (3 episodes, 1992)
Danger Bay (1984) TV series (unknown episodes)

External links

An Evening with Pia Di Ciaula, CCE
London Film Academy

British film editors
Canadian film editors
Living people
Year of birth missing (living people)
Canadian women film editors
British women film editors